Burgkirchen may refer to:

Burgkirchen an der Alz, a municipality in Bavaria, Germany
Burgkirchen am Wald, part of the municipality of Tüßling in Bavaria, Germany
Burgkirchen, Austria, a municipality in Upper Austria